Counsel for the Defense is a 1925 American silent drama film directed by Burton L. King and starring Jay Hunt, Betty Compson, and House Peters. It is based on the 1912 novel of the same name by Leroy Scott.

Plot
As described in a film magazine review, two men who wish to give the town’s waterworks into the hands of a private company are opposed by Doc West, an old doctor. To clear the path for their scheme, they have the doctor arrested and charged with bribery. No local lawyer wishes to oppose the powerful schemers, so the doctor’s daughter Katherine defends him. He loses his case, but the young woman unearths evidence against his enemies, clears his name, and has the others brought to justice.

Cast

Preservation
With no prints of Counsel for the Defense located in any film archives, it is a lost film.

References

External links

1925 films
Films directed by Burton L. King
Lost American films
Films based on American novels
American silent feature films
American black-and-white films
Silent American drama films
1925 drama films
Associated Exhibitors films
1920s American films
1925 lost films
Lost drama films
1920s English-language films